Stephen Reid may refer to:
 Stephen Reid (artist) (1873–1948), British painter and illustrator
 Stephen Reid (writer) (1950–2018), Canadian writer and bank robber
 Stephen Reid (Coronation Street), character on the British soap opera Coronation Street

See also
 Steven Reid (born 1981), Irish football player
 Steven Reid (harness racer), driver of standardbred racehorses in New Zealand
 Steve Reid (disambiguation)